Notre Dame College is a dual-campus independent Roman Catholic co-educational secondary day school located in Shepparton, Victoria, Australia. The college is situated on two campuses: Knight Street Campus, that houses students in Year 7, 8, and 10–12; and the Emmaus Campus, on Grace Road, North Shepparton, that houses students in Year 9 and also the McAuley Champagnat Programme for students who struggle to learn in a normal classroom environment. The college is located within in the Roman Catholic Diocese of Sandhurst.

History
The college initially opened in on 24 February 1901 as Sacred Heart Convent -  later Sacred Heart College, a school for girls. A boys' school,  St Colman's College (which opened on 9 July 1951), was also built on Knight Street. Sacred Heart was established by the Sisters of Mercy, whilst St Colmans was established by the Marist Brothers.

The two schools merged in 1984 after a two-decade period of expansion and increased enrolments in both Colleges. The new amalgamated school was named Notre Dame College, with the literal French meaning of "Our Lady". The campus of St Colman's became known as "South Side" and is the Junior Campus where years 7 to 8 attend. This is also home to the Mercy Centennial Stadium and the original Monastery. The original Sacred Heart campus is known as "North Side" and is home to students from Year 10 to Year 12, as well as the administration building, a chapel, the Ursula Frayne Library and the Bishop Noel Daly centre. In 2009 there was a new campus unveiled known as the Emmaus Campus. It is a community for the Year 9 students only. The current principal is John Cortese.

The year 2001 celebrated the centenary of the establishment of the Sisters of Mercy in Shepparton. This was celebrated through the unveiling of the Mercy Centennial Stadium.

Affiliations
In 1987, Notre Dame College became the sister school of Notre Dame of Marbel University in Koronodal, in the Philippines.

Houses
Notre Dame College operates a house system comprising six houses, changing from the original four in 2004. The six houses are:

Curriculum

School curriculum 

The main areas of study at Notre Dame College are: 
 Religious Education; 
 English; 
 Mathematics; 
 Science;
 Technology; 
 The Arts; 
 Health, Physical Education and Sport; 
 Languages other than English; 
 Humanities

Italian and Japanese are the two languages taught at the school. In Year 7 and 8 students undertake study in a number of compulsory areas. From Year 9 to Year 10, study revolves around a number of core subjects, as well as electives chosen by the students. There is also a program, the Nova Program, on offer to Year 10 students aimed at those who may otherwise want to leave school. This provides a pathway for students to apprenticeships, the Victorian Certificate of Applied Learning, Vocational Education and Training and other employment opportunities.

During Year 11 and 12, there are three pathways available to students:
 Victorian Certificate of Education;
 Victorian Certificate of Applied Learning;
 Vocational Education and Training.

Additional information 
The School hosts a Careers Day for Year 10 students, which is attended by over 1,500 students.

School Productions
Notre Dame is critically acclaimed for their musical productions. 
From 2005 to 2014, Notre Dame staged two productions annually.  In addition to the whole school production, a junior production was performed by Year 7-9 students from 2005 to 2009.  From 2009 to 2011, these Year 7–9 productions were replaced with a Year 9 production.

Graduate Diploma in Education
Notre Dame College offers the year-long Graduate Diploma in Education (Secondary) in conjunction with Australian Catholic University and the Catholic Education Office, Sandhurst.

Notable alumni

 Tom Clurey - Port Adelaide Football Club AFL Footballer
 Chris Connolly - Melbourne Football Club General Manager
 Adam Donovan - member of the Australian band Augie March
 Marcus Drum - Australian rules footballer with Geelong and Fremantle
 Vince Lia - Australian football player
 David McKenzie SBS Commentator, Athlete-cyclist seventh stage winner of the 2000 Giro d’Italia
 David Teague, AFL Footballer
 Sam Wright - Australian rules footballer with North Melbourne
 Will Brodie - Fremantle Football Club AFL Footballer
 Michael Barlow- AFL Footballer
 Lachlan Ash - GWS Giants Football Club AFL Footballer
 Laitham Vandermeer- Western Bulldogs AFL Footballer
 Nathan Drummond- Richmond AFL Footballer
 Alou Kuol- Central Coast Mariners football player
 Jy Simpkin - North Melbourne AFL Footballer
 Josh Rachele-AFL footballer
 Garang Kuol - Socceroo and Newcastle United Football Player

See also

 List of non-government schools in Victoria
 Catholic education in Australia

References

Roman Catholic Diocese of Sandhurst
Educational institutions established in 1954
Association of Marist Schools of Australia
Shepparton
Catholic secondary schools in Victoria (Australia)
1954 establishments in Australia